Sursk is a town in Gorodishchensky District of Penza Oblast, Russia, located on the left bank of the Sura River,  east of Penza, the administrative center of the oblast. Population:

History
It was founded c. 1860 as the village of Nikolsky Khutor. In 1953, it was granted town status and renamed Sursk (after the Sura River).

Administrative and municipal status
Within the framework of administrative divisions, it is incorporated within Gorodishchensky District as the town of district significance of Sursk. As a municipal division, the town of district significance of Sursk is incorporated within Gorodishchensky Municipal District as Sursk Urban Settlement.

References

Notes

Sources

External links
Unofficial website of Sursk

Cities and towns in Penza Oblast